Športno društvo Stojnci, commonly referred to as ŠD Stojnci or simply Stojnci, is a Slovenian football club from Stojnci which plays in the Ptuj Super League, the fourth highest league in the Slovenian football system. The club was founded in 1964.

Honours
Slovenian Third Division
 Winners: 1991–92

Slovenian Fourth Division
 Winners: 1993–94, 1994–95, 1999–2000, 2013–14

MNZ Ptuj Cup
 Winners: 2006–07

League history since 1991

References

Association football clubs established in 1964
Football clubs in Slovenia
1964 establishments in Slovenia